The Head of the Republic of Mari El (formerly President of Mari El Republic) is the highest executive position in the Mari El Republic, a federal subject of the Russian Federation.

The first President of Mari El Republic was Vladislav Zotin when the position was created on 24 December 1991, two days before dissolution of the Soviet Union, replacing the First Secretary of the Mari Communist Party, the equivalent position of the Mari ASSR before it was succeeded by the Mari El Republic. The status and powers of the President were determined by Chapter 4 of the Constitution of the Mari El Republic. In December 2010, Russian President Dmitry Medvedev signed a law that forbade calling the heads of federal subjects as "president", and must bring their constitutions or statutes in conformity with the law before 1 January 2015. The position of President of Mari El Republic was renamed to Head (Vuylatyshyzhe in Mari) in June 2011.

Since 10 May 2022 the Head of the Mari El Republic is Yury Zaitsev.

List of Heads of the Mari El Republic

Elections
The latest election for the office was held on 10 September 2017

Note

References

 Russian Administrative divisions

Politics of Mari El
Mari El